John Danaher may refer to:
John Danaher (VC) (1860–1919), Irish recipient of the Victoria Cross
John A. Danaher (1899–1990), U.S. senator and judge from Connecticut
John A. Danaher III (born 1950), grandson of the above, commissioner of the Connecticut Department of Public Safety
John Danaher (martial artist) (born 1967), Brazilian jiu-jitsu and mixed martial arts instructor